Yun dou juan is a traditional dish of Beijing cuisine.  The traditional culinary method of this dish begins with the preparation of the main ingredient by first crushing the kidney beans and then soaking the crushed beans overnight. The skin of the crushed beans would stay afloat on the surface after a night and thus separated and discarded.  
After the water is heated to the boiling point, the kidney beans would then be boiled in the hot water for at least an hour and then steamed for at least twenty minutes afterward.

The kidney beans would then be crushed and compressed into linear mash/paste form with diameter of 3.5 cm. The mash/paste would then be placed on a piece of wet cloth and formed into rectangular shape with knife, and a layer of bean paste is placed on top of the rectangular shaped kidney bean mash/paste, and rolled together. When serving, the resulting roll would be cut into smaller pieces.

See also
 Khandvi (food)
 Swiss roll
 List of legume dishes

References

Beijing cuisine
Legume dishes